"Udea and her Seven Brothers" is a Northern African (Libyan) fairy tale collected by Hans Stumme in Märchen und Gedichte aus der Stadt Tripolis. Scottish novelist Andrew Lang included it in The Grey Fairy Book.

It is Aarne-Thompson-Uther type ATU 451, "The Maiden Who Seeks her Brothers".

Translations
The original name, as published by Stumme, is Ḫurrâft udḝxä, mtẵllfet essbḝxä. Stumme translated it as Die Geschichte von Udêa, die ihren sieben Brüder in die Fremde wandern liess ("The Story of Udea, who exiled her Brothers into the Wilderness"). It can otherwise be known as Udea und ihre sieben Brüder.

Synopsis
A man and wife had seven sons.  One day, the sons set out hunting and told their aunt that if their mother had a daughter, to wave a white handkerchief, and they would return at once; but if a son, a sickle, and they would keep on.  It was a daughter, but the aunt wished to be rid of the boys, so she waved a sickle.  The daughter, Udea, grew up not knowing about her brothers.  One day, an older child taunted her for driving her brothers away, who were forever roaming the world; she questioned her mother and set out to find them.  Her mother gave her a camel, some food, a cowrie shell about the camel's neck as a charm, an African, Barka, and his wife to take care of her.  On the second day, Barka told Udea to get off the camel so that his wife could ride in her place.  The mother was close by and told Barka to leave Udea alone. On the third day, Barka again told Udea to let his wife ride the camel in her place, but the mother was now too far away to hear and command Barka.  Udea called out for her mother to no avail and Barka threw the girl to the ground.  The wife climbed onto the camel and Udea walked on the ground, her bare feet cut up because of the stones on her path.

One day, they passed a caravan, where they were told of the castle where the brothers lived.  Barka let Udea ride the camel to the castle, but smeared her with pitch, so that her brothers would not recognize her. However, they accepted her without question.  Her tears of joy left white marks on her face.  One alarmed brother took a cloth and rubbed the mark until the pitch was gone.  The brother asked her who had painted her skin black, to which she would not answer, in fear of Barka's anger.  She finally relented, describing the treatment she received during her travels.  The seven brothers were outraged and beheaded both Barka and his wife.

The brothers went hunting for seven days, instructing Udea to lock herself in the castle with only the cat who grew up in the house.  She would follow the cat's advice in all matters and eat nothing that the cat did not eat.  They returned, and found her well.  The brothers then told her of the castle elves and pigeons, who could be called to fetch the brothers in case Udea was in any danger.  The pigeons had seven days' worth of food and water left by the brothers during each hunting trip; Udea asked why they did not have her feed the pigeons daily, because the food they had laid out was old after seven days.  They agreed and told her any kindness towards the pigeons would be considered a kindness towards themselves.

On the brothers' third hunting trip, Udea was cleaning the castle and, forgetting her instructions for a moment, found a bean and ate it.  The cat demanded half.  Udea said she could not, because she had already eaten it, and offered one hundred other beans.  The cat only wanted the bean that Udea had eaten.  To punish the girl, the cat put out the fire in the kitchen.  With no way of cooking, Udea climbed up the castle, saw a fire in the distance and left to find its source.  She asked for a lump of burning coal from the elderly man tending the fire, but he was in fact a "man-eater" (cannibal) and demanded a strip of blood from her ear to her thumb in return.  She bled all the way home, and did not notice the raven that had followed her back until she came upon the castle door.  Startled, she cursed the raven, hoping to startle it as well.  It asked why she would wish harm to one that had done her a favor.  It flew off, along with the dirt it had used to cover her trail of blood.  The man-eater followed this path to the castle and broke six doors in six nights, intending to attack and eat Udea.  On the last day, with only one door in place, she sent a letter to her brothers with the help of the castle pigeons.  The brothers immediately came home and trapped the man-eater in a burning pit.

As the man-eater burned, only one of his fingernails was left behind.  It was blown towards and stabbed Udea under her own fingernail.  She collapsed, lifeless.  Her brothers put her on a bier and the bier on a camel, and set it off to their mother.  They ordered the camel to avoid capture and stop only when someone said, "string."  During the journey, three men chased after the camel, but only when one said that his sandal string was broken did it stop.  The man took Udea's hand and attempted to pull off her ring.  This motion freed the man-eater's fingernail from her hand, and she woke up full of life.  The camel returned her to her joyful brothers, and all the siblings set out to see their parents once again.

On the fourth day of their reunion, the eldest brother told their parents of their aunt's treachery and the adventures they had encountered.

Analysis

Tale type
American folklorist D. L. Ashliman classified the tale in the Aarne-Thompson Index as type AaTh 451, "The Maiden Who Seeks Her Brothers" - thus, "distantly related" to the European tales The Twelve Brothers, The Six Swans and The Seven Ravens. However, folklorist Hasan M. El-Shamy indexes it under a more precise type, AaTh 451A, "The Sister Seeking her Nine Brothers". The tale type is also one of many types listed in the international index that deal with a brother-sister relationship.

As for the second part of the story, the narrative sequence (sister as brothers' housekeeper; fetching fire from ogre; sister dying and brothers carrying her body) is classified in the revised edition of the Aarne-Thompson-Uther Index (post-2004) as type ATU 709A, "The Sister of Nine Brothers". This subtype is, thus, related to type ATU 709, "Snow White".

Motifs
In type AaTh 451A, the sister is replaced by the false sister by changing races with the antagonist, a motif classified in the Motif-Index of Folk-Literature as D30, "Transformation to person of different race".

According to professor John R. Maier, the name of the heroine (Udea, Wudei'a and other spellings) is a linguistic pun related to the destiny of her brothers: her name is related to the word wada'a "sends away", which is what happens to the heroine's brothers as soon as she is born.

Variants

Europe
Variants of tale type AaTh 451A, "The Sister Seeking her Nine Brothers", also exist in European tradition, with a very similar narrative: the sister wants to visit her brothers, but a fairy or other creature steals her garments and passes herself off as the sister. The real one is forced to graze the horses and laments her story in the form of a song. The brothers listen to it and punish the false sister.

Lithuanian folklorist , in Enzyklopädie des Märchens, locates type AaTh 451A as an oikotype that appears "mainly" in the Baltic region. Estonian folklorist  argues that, despite some variants being found among the Mordvins, the Maris and the Russians, the tale type is predominantly found among the Baltic-Finnic and Baltic peoples. Others restrict the narrative to Karelia and surrounding regions in Finland and Russia.

Finland
In regards to similar Finnish tales, Finnish scholarship groups them in the Finnish Catalogue as type AT 533, "Syöjätär ja yhdeksän veljen sisar", "The Witch (or Ogress) and the Sister of Nine Brothers" or "The False Sister" (in Juha Pentikäinen's work): the heroine is on the way to her brothers' house, but meets a creature who assumes her form and passes herself off as the heroine to the brothers.

In a Finnish variant translated by Parker Fillmore as The Little Sister: The Story of Suyettar and the Nine Brothers, a couple's seven sons want their mother to give them a little sister, but, if she gives them a little brother, they will leave home for good. They combine a signal for the birth: a spindle for a girl, an ax for a boy. Their mother gives birth to a sister, but a wicked witch named Suyettar (Syöjätär) puts up an ax to trick the youths into leaving home. Years later, the little sister, named Kerttu, learns of the incident and decides to visit her brothers. Her mother gives her a magic cake to show her the way and a talking dog named Musti as companion. Kerttu travels to the forest and meets Suyettar, an ugly old hag. She scolds the girl for dislking the hag's ugly looks and Kerttu decides to let her join them. When the women pass by a fountain or a lake, the witch tries to convince the girl to take a bath, but the little dog warns her against it. Suyettar breaks the dog's legs everytime, until she kills it, to cease its interference. At last, Kerttu takes a bath in a pond, and Suyettar sprinkles water in her eyes and changes appearances with the girl: Kerttu looks like an old woman and Suyettar looks like the girl. They reach the brothers' cottage and they welcome the false sister as their own. Meanwhile, Kerttu is made to graze the horses during the day, and is taken her tongue by the witch at night to appear as a mute woman. However, the brothers begin to notice that the old woman sings a sad song with a girl's voice, and think something is amiss. They discover the truth, restore their sister's true looks and burn Suyettar in a sauna.

In another Finnish tale, collected from Ilomantsi and translated by Emmy Schreck as Von dem Mädchen, das ausging ihre Brüder zu suchen ("About the maiden who seeks her brothers"), a couple has nine sons, who leave home because they fear their mother will give birth to another son. So they combine a signal: a spindle if a girl, and an axe if a boy. The mother gives birth to a girl, but a witch (unnnamed in the tale) mixes up the objects and accelerate the brothers' departure. Some time later, the little sister, now grown up, wants to visit her brothers. Her mother bakes with the girl's tears a magic loaf of bread that can guide her to her brothers, and she goes on the way with her little dog Piikka. She meets a witch on the road, who tries to convince her to take a bath with her since it is summer, but the little dog warns the girl against it. The witch maims the dog little by little, until she kills it out of mercy, and manages to change places with the girl by a magic spell. The witch, now changed into the sister, meets the brothers, while the true sister, shapeshifted as the witch, is made to graze the horses. One of the brothers notices the witch-herder singing a song about her misfortune and discovers she is their sister. They reverse the transformation and lock up the witch in a bath-house to burn. As she burns, the witch curses the brothers by saying that grasshoppers shall come out of her eyes, crows from her ears, magpies from her hairs and ravens from her toes, to damage and destroy the properties of people.

Lithuania
Lithuanian folklorist , in his analysis of Lithuanian folktales (published in 1936), listed 20 variants of type *452 (a type not indexed in the international classification, at the time), under the banner Sesuo, ieško savo devynių brolių ("The Sister Seeking her Nine Brothers"). In these tales, the heroine is replaced by a fairy woman when she goes to bathe. In a later revision of the catalogue, professor Bronislava Kerbelytė renames it as type AT 451A, Sesuo, ieškanti devynių brolių ("Sister Seeking Nine Brothers"), with 79 variants registered.

Latvia
A similar story is found in Latvia, also classified as type AaTh 451A, Māsu pazīst pēc dziesmas ("The Sister is recognized by her song"): the heroine goes to visit her nine brothers accompanied by her pet (a puppy or a rabbit). The little animal tries to warn her of the witch, but the villainess kills the animal and assumes her appearance with a spell. The true heroine is made to graze horses. She sings a song during her chores and is recognized by her brother.

Estonia
In the Estonian Catalogue, the type is known as Ee 451A, Üheksa velje sõsar ("The Sister of Nine Brothers"). In this type, after the girl is born, a devil mixes the signal to confuse the brothers and accelerate their departure. Years later, when their sister is on her way to her brothers, the devil's daughter replaces her with a magical disguise and forces the sister as her brothers' cowherd. When the girl sings her misfortune, the deception is revealed.

Russia
Scholar Andreas Johns locates one Russian version of type 451A, collected in Ryazan by Russian folklorists Gilianova and Frumkin. In this variant, the sister is replaced by Baba Yaga (called Yaga-Baba, in the story). As with the other variants, the heroine sings her lament, which reveals the deception.

Mari people
At least two tales from the Cheremis (Mari people), collected by Arvid Genetz, contain the sister seeking her brothers, a witch or usurper taking her place, and the heroine's brothers discovering the ruse and punishing the false heroine.

In one of the tales collected by Genetz, translated into Hungarian as A Víziszellem lánya ("The Daughter of the Water Spirit"), a couple has three sons and a daughter. Some time passes, and the three sons cross the Os Vics ("White Water", Mari designation for the Belaya River). Their sister tells her mother she wants to visit her brothers, and departs with a silver horse and a little dog. When the comes near the margin of the Belaya River, the daughter of the Water Spirit appears and invites the girl to bathe with her in the river. The girl dimisses her request, then the daughter of the Water Spirit threatens to devour her. The girl complies, takes off her clothes and enters the river. Soon, the daughter of the Water Spirit steals the girl's clothes and forces her to wear her garments. The duo meets the three brothers, the daughter of the Water Spirit passes herself off as their sister, while the true sister is made to herd the horses. One day, the brothers notice that their horses look emaciated, and decide to investigate. One of the brothers discovers that the girl is their true sister, by a song she sings, and she reveals the truth. They get the false sister and tie her on horses as punishment. She curses them, saying that parts of her body shall be transformed into other things: her head into a hill, her ears into a shell, her stomach into a flour vat, her feet into a hoe. Another version of the tale was published with the title Hogyan keletkeztek a dombok és a völgyek? ("How did mountains and hills originate?"), with an etiological bent: when the daughter of the Water Spirit is punished in this tale, she curses her body parts to become hills, mountains and valleys.

Chuvash people
Hungarian scholarship located a variant from the Chuvash people, collected in 1940 and published with the title Pige és Hirhim ("Pige and Hirhim"). In this tale, the seven elder sons of an old couple decide to leave home, but tell their parents to leave a sign announcing the birth of their little sibling. Time passes, and a girl named Hirhim is born to them. One day, she learns about her seven older brothers and decides to visit them. She is accompanied by a rooster, a little dog and a little hen. On the way there, she meets another girl named Pige, who decides to join the retinue. They pass by seven seas, Hirhim chanting a song to open up each sea as they make the crossing. Before each sea, Pige tries to wear Hirhim's clothes, but she is stopped by the little animals. Pige succeeds before the seventh sea, takes Hirhim's place and passes herself as the sister. Pige, disguised as their sister, is welcomed by the brothers and Hirhim is made to feed the horses. The brothers notice that the servant girl is singing a lament and realize she is the real Hirhim.

Mordvin people
In a tale from the Mordvin people translated into Hungarian as Vardinye, a couple has two sons. One day, the mother is pregnant, and the sons ask her to announce the birth of their new sibling: if a girl, hang a spool and a carding comb; if a boy, a plow and a harrow. A girl is born and the brothers depart. Time passes, and the girl, named Anyuta, is mocked by Vadinye about not having brothers. Anyuta tells her mother, who confesses that Anyuta's brothers left home. Anyuta decides to visit them, and Vardinye accompanies her. They stop on the way to the brothers' house and Vardinye tries to convince Anyuta to take a bath. Anyuta declines every chance she gets, until Vardinyes manages to wear Anyuta's clothes and passes herself off as the true sister. The duo arrives at the brothers' house and Vardinye introduces herself as their sister, while Anyuta, in Vardinye's clothes, is made to sleep and work in the barn. One night, they hear Anyuta asking the moon about her mother and father, and realize the truth. The brothers take Vardinye to the bath house, the brothers' wives undress her, and tie her to a horse's tail to be punished. Some time later, Anyuta and her brothers settle into a routine, but Anyuta's sisters-in-law, jealous of the attention, plot against her: first, they kill sheep, a cow and a horse and place the blame on the girl, then, to worsen the situation, the elder brother's wife kills her own son and accuses Anyuta of the crime. The elder brother takes Anyuta to the woods, cuts her hands and abandons her there. The tale then segues into tale type ATU 706, "The Maiden Without Hands".

Russian author  published a similar Mordvin tale titled "Сыре Варда" ("Gray Varda"), a peasant couple have three sons, who helped their father in the fields. One time, they feel they need to leave home and seek their own fortune, but before they depart, they plant a green branch under a window as a token of life. In time, they have another child, a girl. The girl lives with them and waters the green branch. One day, she goes back home in tears, and cries over not having older brothers. Their parents tell her the elder brothers left home to greener pastures, and she decides to visit them. As a parting gift, her mother tells her that her tears shall protect her. The girl, dresses in beautiful clothes, begins her journey and finds on the road an old, hunchbacked woman named Gray Varda, who joins her. They pass by a stream and Gray Varda convinces the girl to take a bath in the river. While the girl bathes in the river, the old woman tries the girl's clothing, but the girl pleads and her mother's voice interrupts Gray Varda. They continue to another stream, where Gray Varda manages to change places with the girl. They reach the brothers' house and she passes herself off as their sister, ans says she found a servant in the forest to work for them in the barn. The next morning, the  brothers go to harvest the grains, and the true sister, with a song, summons birds to create a ruckus in their house. Later, she summons the bird with a song to clean up the place. By these actions, the brothers recognize their true sister and punish Gray Varda by tying her to a horse. Later, the girl is escorted back to their parents' house by the brothers and they celebrate.

Asia
Professor , in his catalogue of Persian folktales, listed 4 Iranian tales he grouped under type *451, "Das Mädchen sucht seine Brüder" ("The Girl Seeks her Brothers"). These tales closely follow the second part of Udea'''s tale: the brothers depart from home, the girl looks for them and is welcomed by them as their sister. One day, when the brothers are out on a hunt and the heroine is cleaning up the place, a cat comes and puts out the fire. Thus, the heroine has to look for fire with a cannibalistic creature.

Africa
French ethnologist , in her study about the Kabylian oral repertoire, named this group of tales as Les sept frères et leur soeur Fat'ma la négresse ("The Seven Brothers and their Sister Fat'ma, the Black Girl"), also classified as type 451.

North Africa
German ethnologist Leo Frobenius collected another North African variant with the title Die Prinzessin und die 7 Brüder ("The Princess and the Seven Brothers"). In this tale, a sultan's wife is expecting her eighth child. The sultan's seven other sons learn of the news and rejoice if it is a girl, but will leave the kingdom if it is a boy. A girl is born and a servant runs to the seven princes to tell them - wrongfully - that a brother was born. They decide to leave. Fourteen years pass, and the girl breaks a jan. She is mockingly reminded of the fate of her seven older brothers and decides to look for them. She leaves the palace with a parrot as companion and Black slavewoman. They pass by a fountain and leave the parrot there, while the Black slave suggests the princess trade places with her on the camel's back. They reach a place with two fountains: one that makes black skin into white and another that darkens the skin. The Black slave jumps into the white fountain and becomes white-skinned, as the princess jumps into the black fountain and acquires a black countenance. The Black slave, now white, passes herself off as the true princess and meets the seven brothers. They invite her to live with them. The true princess, now a slave, herds the camels and laments over her sad fate. Six of the brothers' camels overhear the sad story and begin to lose weight, while the seventh camel, which cannot listen, starts to get fatter and healthier. The seventh brother decides to investigate into the matter and notices the slave's lament. A little bird blurts it out that the false sister may have bleached the skin, but could not conceal the texture of her natural hair. The brothers discover the ploy, return to the fountains to restore his sister and mete out a cruel punishment on the slavewoman.

Leo Frobenius collected a third North African variant titled Die Tochter und die Negerin ("The Daughter and the Black Woman"): a couple have seven sons, and the wife is expecting an eighth child. The seven brothers make a vow to break pots as sign of the birth of a brother and leave home, and celebrate if it is a girl. A setut (an evil old woman) comes to them and lies about the birth of a little brother. They leave home. Years pass, and the little girl is raised by her parents. One day, the same setut mocks the girl for her seven lost brothers. She asks her mother and she reveals about the seven older brothers. The girl decides to visit them, accompanied by a black slave woman and a talking grain of corn. A few miles into the journey, the slavewoman wants to ride a bit on the girl's donkey, but the grain of corn advised the girl to keep going. Some time later, the pair stops by a fountain: the girl puts the grain of corn on a rock and bathes the fountain for black people and changes into a black person, while the slavewoman bathes in a fountain for white people and becomes white. The slavewoman, now with a white countenance, changes places with the girl and introduces herself to the seven brothers as their sister, while the girl is sent to herd the camels. She sings a sad song to the camels, which listen to her song and forget to eat, save  for a deaf camel. The youngest brother notices the camels becoming emaciated and discovers the girl's true identity. The other brother set a test for the false sister and the girl, unmask the false sister and take them to the springs to be restored to their original forms. The brother tie the slavewoman to a tree and leave her to the mercy of animals. The tale ends with the brothers untying the slavewoman to help them find their youngest brother, who was taken by lions to their den.

El-Shamy collected a variant from Western Desert (Egypt), near Libya, with the title Wdai¿ah: The Sister of the Seven. In this tale, the usual story happens with the departure of the brothers and the girl making the journey. On the way, the slave girl insists she may ride the camel at some point, but the girl refuses by listening to the magical bead. They stop by a fountain, the Slaves' Spring, which can change one's appearance if one bathes in it. The slave convinces the girl to bathe after her, and to ride the camel as she goes on foot. She agrees and trades places with the slave girl. They resume their journey and reach the brothers' house, where they embrace the slave girl (changed by the powers of the spring) as their sister, while the girl, looking like a slave, is made to pasture the animals. The girl laments her fate and the animals hear her story, save one camel. The brothers notice the animals looking thinner every day and the false sister suggests the girl has been stealing their fodder. The youngest brother, Ahmad, decides to be on lookout, and overhears the girl repeating the sad story to the animals.

In a Western Saharan variant, titled Shreser Dahbú, an old woman has seven sons. When their mother is pregnant again, the brothers express their wish to have a little sister, otherwise they will leave if they have a little brother. Their mother gives birth to a girl, but the maidservant mixes up the signals (a spoon for a girl, a musaad for a boy), and they leave home. Years later, the girl, named Shreser Dahbú, learns from their neighbours that her brothers left home because of her and decides to pay them a visit. Shreser Dahbú climbs on a camel and is joined by a black-skinned servant named Kumba. They pass by a uad with a milk spring, where Kumba bathes in and becomes white-skinned. Kumba forces Shreser Dahbú to walk on foot and guide the camel, while she rides on the animal. They reach another fountain, now of tar, and Kumba forces Shreser Dahbú to bathe in tar to become a black-skinned woman. They arrive at the brothers' house, and Kumba passes herself off as their sisters. Some time later, the brothers notice the strange behaviour of the servant girl: she grazes the horses and sings a song, and the horses do not eat the food. Ahmed, the eldest brother, beats her up for that and some drops of blood land on his clothes. Ahmed tries to wash them off, but they still stain his garments. He consults with a kadi, a wise man, who tells him that the blood indicates their blood relation, and suggests a test to her and the false sister. They prepare a meal and invite the false sister and the servant girl; the servant girl compliments the food, but wishes someone could take a portion to their mother. The brothers notice the deception, kill Kumba and take Shreser Dahbú to the tar spring to restore her. The tale then segues into another type, with Shreser Dahbú having to deal with the envy of other women.Tortajada, Anna. Hijas de la arena. Lumen, 2002. pp. 162ff. .

Kabylia
French missionary Joseph Rivière collected and published a Kabylian tale from Djurdjura with the title Les Sept Frères ("The Seven Brothers"). In this tale, the king's seven sons pray that their mother gives birth to a girl, for they will raise a flag and celebrate her birth. If to a boy, they will still raise a flag, but leave home. The queen gives birth to a girl, but their aunt tells them it is a boy. They leave home. Years later, the little girl is fetching water when she accidentally breaks the jar. She is told by a passing woman that her brothers left home. She returns home, boils water and threatens to burn her mother's hand in the boiling water is she does not reveal the truth. The girl prepares a journey to her brothers and is gifted a magical pearl, a camel and a slavewoman by her father. After some walking, they stop by two fountains: the princess, named Dania, washes herself in the fountain for the slaves, while the slavewoman refreshes herself in the fountain for the freemen. Some miles later, the slavewoman insists that the princess climbs down the camel, but she consults with the pearl that she cannot do it. After some distance, the pearl does not answer anymore and the slavewoman replaces Dania as the brothers' sister. The seven youths embrace the slavewoman as their sister, while Dania is made to herd their camels. Dania eats a piece of bread and laments over her fate to a nearby rock, which is heard by six of the camels, except a deaf animal. The youngest brother overhears it and consults with a wise man, who answers that their true sister has "chevelure [...] brillante" ("hair [that is] shining"). They unmask the false sister and kill her, and restore their sister in the fountain of the freemen.

Hasan El-Shamy collected another variant from a male teller in Kabyle (Algeria), which he titled [We Need a Sister]. In this tale, seven brothers live in a mountain village, and decide to leave home for good in case another son is born to their mother. A Settût (a being in North African folklore) decides to speed up the process and trick the brothers that another son was born. They depart. Years later, the same Settût tells the girl of her brothers and she decides to go after them. The girl rides on a horse with a magical grain as the communication device. The girl is warned not to drink or bathe in the fountain for the slaves, but to use the fountain for "whites". After a great distance from home, the slave-girl uses the white fountain and the girl the black fountain. The slave-girl forces the true sister to get off the horse and to attend to her as her servant. They reach the brothers' house and the true sister is made to graze the horses. She laments her fate to the horses, who feel her sadness and become emaciated. The brothers discover the confession and consult with a neighbouring man on how to reveal the deceit.

Algeria
French linguist  collected and published an Algerian variant in the Chenoua language with the title Aventures d'une jeune fille qui va a la recherche de ses sept frères ("Adventures of a Girl that is searching for her Seven Brothers"): a woman has seven sons already and becomes pregnant again. Her sons ask her to wave a red flag for a son, and they'll leave home, and a white flag for a girl. A girl is born, but their mother's black slave waves a red flag and they depart. Years later, the girl learns of her brothers' departure and decides to visit them joined by a personal slavewoman. During the journey, her slavewoman asks her to ride the mule, but the girl asks her mother through a little magical bell. Some time later, the girl stumbles and falls, and her little bell breaks. The girl and the slavewoman pass by two fountains: the girl bathes in one of the fountains and her skin becomes black, while the other's skin becomes white. The slavewoman replaces the girl as the brothers' true sister. She is made to graze the brebis and laments her situation. A man passes by and overhears her mournful lament, and reports the finding to the brothers. They unmask the false sister and restore their true sister to her rightful place. The tale then continues with the sister's pregnancy and further adventures.

In a tale from M'zab translated into Spanish with the title La huérfana y las dos esclavas ("The Orphan Girl and the Two Slaves"), a young Mozabite girl lives with alone her mother, but longs to play and talk to siblings, since other girls in her village have one. So one day, she asks her mother about it, and the latter tells her about her seven elder brothers who left home to find work elsewhere. Despite their village lying on the other side of the desert, and her mother's protests, the girl decides to journey there, takes her things and leaves for the village's gates. There, she finds two black slaves that coincidently are travelling to the same location. So the trio travel together until they stop just before the next village where the brother live. The black slaves tie up the Mozabite girl and paint her skin with black ink, so she can look like a slave, and paint one of the slave's skins white. The black slaves threaten the girl and force her to keep quiet about their plan, and go to meet the seven brothers. The girl, painted with black paint, is introduced as another slave and made to herd their camels. Every night, after she herds the camel to the stables, she exposes her sorrows in the form of a song, and a camel appears dead the next morning, until there is only one remaining. The brothers begin to notice the strangeness of the situation, and the younger one decides to investigate: he hides in the stables and listens to the girl's lament about the slaves trading places with her. The younger brother hatches a plan to unmask the false sister: he asks her to fetch some water and to help him wash his hands. When the false sister does, the water washes away her body paint. The younger brother reveals the deception to his siblings, who punish the two slaves and reinstate their true sister.

Morocco
In a Moroccan variant collected by Jilali El Koudia with the title The Little Sister with Seven Brothers, a girl is born as the eighth child of a king, but the seven other princes receive the wrong information that it was a brother and depart from the kingdom. Years later, the girl learns that her brothers became a king and province governors in another realm and decides to visit them. She is accompanied by a pair of black slaves and a magical artifact named mejoun, which gives her instructions on how to avoid being deceived by the slaves. However, the slaves notice the mejoun and break it against a rock. They reach a stop with two fountains, a white one that makes people white, and a black one that makes people black. The pair washes themselves in the white fountain and forces the princess to bathe in the black one. The trio reach the brothers' kingdom and they embrace the false sister as their own. Some time later, the camelherd flees for some reason and the slave (the true sister) is made to herd them. She laments her fate and the camels, out of pity, join in her sorrow and become thin and emaciated. One of the brothers, the sultan, discovers the strange incident and questions the slave herd. She confesses the whole story and the camels begin to eat healthier again. The sultan orders some guard to take the false sister and her companion t the black fountain to restore their true form, and to punish them. The tale continues as another tale type, but with the sisters-in-law as the antagonists. The tale was classified as type AaTh 451A.

In another Moroccan tale published by author Inea Bushnaq with the title The Girl who Banished Seven Youths, a mother insists she will give birth to a daughter every time she is pregnant, but she gives birth to a boy. On her eighth pregnancy, the mother's sister says she will announce to her nephews their sibling's birth: with a spindle if a girl, and a sickle if a boy. The girl is born, but the aunt brandishes a sickle, signaling the birth of a boy. The seven youths believe another son was born and depart. The girl is given the name Wudei'a who Sent Away Subei'a, or The Girl who Banished Seven. When she is young, Wudei'a learns of her elder seven brothers, and tells her mother she wishes to visit them. The mother sends Wudei'a on a camel with a manservant and a maid. On the road, the manservant tries to convince Wudei's to let the maid ride on the camel, but the girl calls out for her mother, who forbids the maid. This works twice, but on the third time, Wudei'a is too far for her mother to answer her pleas. Thus, Wudei'a is made to walk on foot, while her maid rides the camel. They pass by a caravan, and a merchant directs them to the seven brothers' castle. Before they arrive, the manservant rubs Wudei’a's face with pitch to pass her as a black slave, while the maid is introduces as their sister. Wudei's, as a black slave, is made to delouse the brothers, when her tears fall on her arm, cleaning away part of the pitch. The brothers notice the deception, kill the manservant and the maid, and give her water to wash her self. The brothers welcome Wudei'a as their true sisters and they spend time together. On the third day, they warn her to lock up the castle gate, for they will go on a hunt. In the second part of the tale, a cat puts out the fire with urine as payback for Wudei'a not sharing food, which forces the girl to look for fire with a ghoul. The ghoul goes after her, but is killed by her brothers. Wudei'a falls into a death-like state due to the ghoul's nail pricking her finger. Her body is placed on a bier, on a camel. One time, the camel makes a bow, causing the bier to fall to the ground. Robbers try to rob Wudei’a's ring from her finger, and dislodge the ghoul's nail, thus bringing her back to life. Wudei'a wakes up and rides the camel back to her brothers.Maier, John R. Desert Songs: Western Images of Morocco and Moroccan Images of the West. SUNY Press, 1996. pp. 231-235. .

 Tunisia 
In a Tunisian tale titled Oudiâ Mtellfa Sbiâ and translated into French as La Doucette qui fit perdre les sept, seven brothers tell their mother they will leave home if she does not give birth to a daughter, and propose a signal to announce their sibling's birth: a sickle for a boy, and a red cloth for a girl. The woman gives birth to a girl, but her sister-in-law changes the signals and waves a sickle, so her nephews depart. Years later, the girl, now named Oudiâ Mtellfa Sbiâ, learns from a neighbour of her elder brothers' departure and questions her mother about it. The woman confirms the story and Oudiâ Mtellfa Sbiâ decides to visit them. The woman fills snail shells with her tears, string a necklace with them, gives it to her daughter and tells her never to take it off, then orders a Black servant to accompany Oudiâ Mtellfa Sbiâ in a camel. So the girl begins her journey. After a while, the Black servant, but the snail shells warns her against it. After another while, Oudiâ Mtellfa Sbiâ is convinced by the Black servant to get off the camel and drink some water from a fountain. She does that and loses her mother's necklace. After a third while, the Black servant orders Oudiâ Mtellfa Sbiâ to come off the camel, he and his wife take the camel and ride away, abandonign the girl in the desert. Oudiâ Mtellfa Sbiâ wanders through the desert until she finds stops to rest under a tree. A man passes by her and inquires her presence there. She tells him the whole story and the man recognizes her as her sister. He takes her to live with their brothers and their wives, and her opinion begins to be more valude by the men of the house than their wives', to the latter' chagrin. Oudiâ Mtellfa Sbiâ's sisters-in-law then conspire to have her eat a snake's egg to humiliate her, as the tale continues as another tale type.

See also

The Twelve Wild Ducks
The Six Swans
The Seven Ravens
The Goose Girl
The Lord of Lorn and the False Steward
Vasilisa the Beautiful
Snow White
Bella Venezia
Gold-Tree and Silver-Tree
The Twelve Brothers

Footnotes

References

Further reading
 . "La jeune fille qui cherche ses frères". In: Genres, Forms, Meaning, Essays in African Oral Literature''. Edited by Veronika Görog–Karödy. Oxford, Jaso, 1982. pp. 45–56.

External links
Udea and her Seven Brothers
Udea and her Seven Brothers-Project Gutenberg

African fairy tales
Cannibalism in fiction
Fiction about shapeshifting
ATU 400-459
ATU 700-749